Dean Miller is the self-titled debut album of American country music artist Dean Miller. It was released in 1997 on Capitol Records Nashville. Three singles were released from it: "Nowhere, USA", "My Heart's Broke Down (But My Mind's Made Up)", and "Wake Up and Smell the Whiskey", which was previously recorded by Brett James on his 1995 self-titled debut. Respectively, these three songs reached numbers 54, 67, and 57 on the Hot Country Songs charts. The track "I Feel Bad" features a spoken-word intro by radio host Ralph Emery.

Following this album's release, Miller left Capitol and signed in 2002 to Universal South Records, where he released three more singles for an unreleased album, entitled Just Me. His third album, Platinum, was finally issued in 2005 on Audium Entertainment.

Track listing
"Nowhere, USA" (Dean Miller) – 3:22
"Wake Up and Smell the Whiskey" (Miller, Brett James) – 2:51
"I Used to Know Her" (Miller, Sharon Rice) – 4:19
"My Heart's Broke Down (But My Mind's Made Up)" (Miller, Sarah Majors) – 2:38
"Broke Down in Birmingham" (Conley White, Brian Tabor, Tammy Dodge) – 3:41
"I Feel Bad" (Miller, Kelli Owens) – 3:28
"Missing You" (Miller, Stacy Dean Campbell) – 3:18
"If I Was Your Man" (Miller, Campbell) – 4:37
"The Long Way Home" (Miller, Campbell, Daniel Keyes Tashian) – 3:45
"Dreams" (Miller) – 3:14
"The Running Side of Me" (Miller, Campbell) – 4:03

Personnel
Sam Bacco – percussion
Pat Buchanan – acoustic guitar, electric guitar
Larry Byrom – acoustic guitar
J. T. Corenflos – electric guitar, six-string bass guitar, acoustic guitar solo on "The Long Way Home"
Dan Dugmore – lap steel guitar, pedal steel guitar
Larry Franklin – fiddle
Carl Gorodetzky – violin
Tony Harrell – Hammond B-3 organ on "Nowhere, USA", piano on "Wake Up and Smell the Whiskey" and "My Heart's Broke Down (But My Mind's Made Up)"
Steve Hinson – pedal steel guitar on "Wake Up and Smell the Whiskey"
Fats Kaplin – accordion on "The Long Way Home"
Tim Lauer – accordion on "Nowhere, USA"
Billy Livsey – Hammond B-3 organ, Wurlitzer
Raul Malo – background vocals on "Nowhere, USA"
Bob Mason – cello
Kelli Owens –  background vocals
Michael Rhodes – bass guitar
Sharon Rice – background vocals on "I Used to Know Her"
Tammy Rogers – fiddle and viola on "Broke Down in Birmingham", mandolin
Hargus "Pig" Robbins – piano
Pamela Sixfin – violin
Robbie Turner – lap steel guitar on "Wake Up and Smell the Whiskey", pedal steel guitar on "Broke Down in Birmingham"
Steve Turner – drums, percussion
Billy Joe Walker, Jr. – acoustic guitar on "Broke Down in Birmingham"
Kris Wilkinson – viola
Trisha Yearwood – background vocals on "Dreams"

References

1997 debut albums
Capitol Records albums
Dean Miller albums